Jonathan Jasper Wright (February 11, 1840 – February 18, 1885) was an African-American lawyer who served as a state senator and judge on the Supreme Court of the State of South Carolina during Reconstruction from 1870 to 1877.

Biography
Wright was born on February 11, 1840, in Luzerne County, Pennsylvania. When he was about six years old his parents moved to Montrose, Susquehanna County, Pennsylvania. He attended the district school during the winter months, working for the neighboring farmers the rest of the year.

He saved up a small sum of money and entered Lancasterian University in Ithaca, New York State. After a thorough course of study there, he returned to the village where his parents resided. He received an honorary LL.D from Avery College in Pittsburgh. He entered the office of a law firm, where he read law for two years, supporting himself by teaching. He subsequently entered the office of Judge Collins, in Wilkes-Barre, Pennsylvania, with whom he read law for another year. He applied for admission to the Bar but the committee refused to examine him because of racial prejudice.

In April 1865, Wright was sent by the American Missionary Society to Beaufort, South Carolina, as a teacher and laborer among the freed slaves. He remained in Beaufort until the Civil Rights Act passed. Then he returned to Montrose, Pennsylvania, and demanded an examination for the Bar.  The Committee found him qualified, and recommended his admission to the Bar. He was admitted August 13, 1865, and was the first African American admitted to practice law in Pennsylvania.

In April 1866, Wright was appointed by General Oliver Otis Howard, head of the Freedmen's Bureau in Beaufort, to be the legal adviser for the freedmen. In July 1868 he was elected to the Constitutional Convention of South Carolina. He was the convention vice-president and helped draft the judiciary section of the State Constitution, which remains today. Wright was soon afterward elected state senator from Beaufort County. On February 1, 1870, he was elected to the South Carolina Supreme Court. He served for seven years, until the white Democrats regained control of state government in 1877. Wright left the Court and entered into private practice in Charleston. He died of tuberculosis in 1885.

The United States Law Review gave a scornful summary of his career after his death. His death was covered on the front page of the Charleston News and Courier including the statement that "one more relic of Reconstruction disappears."

Notes

See also
List of African-American jurists
List of first minority male lawyers and judges in South Carolina

References
 .
 .
 Picture and text from Harper's Weekly, March 5, 1870, p. 149.
 .
 .
 .
 .
 .

External links
 The Jonathan Jasper Wright Award at the Law School of the University of South Carolina

People of the Reconstruction Era
Justices of the South Carolina Supreme Court
African-American lawyers
1840 births
1885 deaths
U.S. state supreme court judges admitted to the practice of law by reading law
South Carolina Republicans
19th-century American judges
19th-century American lawyers